Ruth Hardy Funk (February 11, 1917 – February 5, 2011) was the seventh general president of the Young Women organization of the Church of Jesus Christ of Latter-day Saints (LDS Church) from 1972 to 1978.

Biography
Born in Chicago, Illinois, Ruth Hardy was raised in Salt Lake City, Utah. She was a talented musician and excelled at classical piano. She attended the University of Utah and earned a degree in music in 1938. On December 31, 1938, Ruth married Marcus C. Funk in the Salt Lake Temple. Shortly thereafter, the couple moved to Chicago so Marcus could attend the dental school at Northwestern University.

When Funk moved back to Salt Lake City, she became a member of the general board of the YWMIA. In 1972, LDS Church president Harold B. Lee asked Funk to succeed Florence S. Jacobsen as the president of the organization. During her administration, the Young Womanhood Recognition and the Personal Progress programs were initiated. In 1972, the Young Men's Mutual Improvement Association and the Young Women's Mutual Improvement Association were merged and renamed Aaronic Priesthood MIA Young Women. This merge was only temporary, however, and in 1974 the organizations were separated again and renamed the Young Men and the Young Women. In 1978, Funk was released and was succeeded by Elaine A. Cannon.

After her tenure as Young Women president, Funk served as the chair of the Governor's Commission on the Status of Women in Utah and has been a member of the board of directors of Bonneville International Corporation. For eight years she served as a member and chair of the Utah State Board of Education.

She died peacefully in her Salt Lake City home on February 5, 2011, surrounded by her children.

Funk is a descendant of prominent nineteenth century Mormon George Reynolds.

See also
Ardeth G. Kapp : Funk's second counselor

References
Janet Peterson and LaRene Gaunt (1993). Keepers of the Flame: General Presidents of the Young Women (Salt Lake City: Deseret Book)
Kristen Moulten, "Friends mourn passing of pianist, LDS youth leader", Salt Lake Tribune, 2011-02-07.
Wendy Leonard, "Former LDS Young Women president Ruth Funk dies at home", Deseret News, 2011-02-06
Marianne Holman, 'A noble leader filled with faith, inspired by God', Church News, 2011-02-18

External links
Sarah Jane Weaver, "Building on a Firm Foundation for Latter-day Saint Young Women: President Monson Lauds Legacy of Former Mormon Church Auxiliary Leaders," Church News, Nov. 26, 2009
Neylan McBaine, "From Concerts to Correlation: Ruth Hardy Funk,"  January 18, 2010, Salt Lake City, Utah
Ruth H. Funk, "Come, Listen to a Prophet’s Voice", Ensign, Nov. 1978, 106
Ruth H. Funk, "Ready to Receive," May 28, 1974, BYU Devotional

1917 births
American leaders of the Church of Jesus Christ of Latter-day Saints
General Presidents of the Young Women (organization)
People from Salt Lake City
University of Utah alumni
2011 deaths
Latter Day Saints from Illinois
Latter Day Saints from Utah